Shicheng County is a county in the southeast of Jiangxi province, People's Republic of China, bordering Fujian province to the east. It is the easternmost county-level division of the prefecture-level city of Ganzhou.

Culture
Like their cousins in other counties of the southern Jiangxi uplands, the people of Shicheng are Hakkas, and pride themselves on their heritage of friendliness, especially to guests and strangers (Hospitality).

Demographics

Population

Climate

Economy

Transportation
National Route 206 crosses the county from north to south, from Guangchang County town in Fuzhou to Ruijin City, Ganzhou.

Province-maintained roads lead off 206, westward through Pingshan Town into Ningdu County, Ganzhou, and eastward (over the watershed into Fujian), to Shibi Town and Ninghua County-town, both in Sanming.

Agriculture
The county's agricultural economy is bolstered by lotus as well as by the tobacco picked up by the government-monopoly CNTC.

Politics

Administration
 
The county government, lower-level court, CPC branch and GongAn branch are located in Qinjiang town on National Route 206.

Towns (镇, zhen)
There are 5  towns: 
Gaotian, Xiaosong, Pingshan, Huangjiang and Qinjiang

Townships (乡, xiang)
There are 5 townships:
Mulan, Fengshan, Zhukeng, Dayou and Longgang, 
 5 former townships are merged to other: Changtian, Yanling, Guanxia, Xiaoguand Yangdi

Geography

References

External links
Official website of Shichang County government

Ganzhou
County-level divisions of Jiangxi